Tuh Medad (also Romanized as Tūh Medad) is a village in Sardasht Rural District, Sardasht District, Dezful County, Khuzestan Province, Iran. At the 2006 census, its population was 33, in 7 families.

References 

Populated places in Dezful County